Habronattus peckhami is a species of spider in the family Salticidae. It is found in the USA.

References

 Bradley, Richard A. (2012). Common Spiders of North America. University of California Press.
 Ubick, Darrell (2005). Spiders of North America: An Identification Manual. American Arachnological Society.

External links

 NCBI Taxonomy Browser, Habronattus peckhami

Salticidae
Spiders described in 1921
Taxa named by Nathan Banks